Kamil Djamaloudinov (born August 15, 1979 in Dagestan) is a boxer from Russia, who won the bronze medal in the featherweight division (– 57 kg) at the 2000 Summer Olympics in Sydney, Australia. In the semifinals he was defeated by eventual runner-up Ricardo Juarez from the United States. He captured the silver medal at the 1999 World Amateur Boxing Championships in Houston, United States.

Olympic results
Defeated Vidas Bičiulaitis (Lithuania) 9-5
Defeated Francisco Bojado (Mexico) 15-12
Defeated Yosvani Aguilera (Cuba) 17-12
Lost to Rocky Juarez (Mexico) 12-23

References
 databaseOlympics.com

1979 births
Living people
People from Dagestan
Featherweight boxers
Boxers at the 2000 Summer Olympics
Olympic boxers of Russia
Olympic bronze medalists for Russia
Olympic medalists in boxing
Russian male boxers
AIBA World Boxing Championships medalists
Medalists at the 2000 Summer Olympics
Sportspeople from Dagestan